Planning use classes are the legal framework which determines what a particular property may be used for by its lawful occupants. In England and Wales, these are contained within the text of Town and Country Planning (Use Classes) Order 1987 (Statutory Instrument 1987 No. 764).

The use classes were reformed in September 2020. The 1987 use classes were replaced by the new use classes introduced in the Town and Country Planning (Use Classes) (Amendment) (England) Regulations 2020. The following use classes were replaced by the new Use Class E - Commercial, Business and Service:

 A1 - Shops
 A2 - Financial and Professional Services
 A3 - Restaurants and Cafes
 B1 - Business
 D1 - Non- residential institutions

Overview 
The Town and Country Planning (Use Classes) Order 1987 came into force on 1 June 1987, replacing the previous 1972 and 1983 versions. It defines the possible uses of a site, with “site” meaning “the whole area of land within a single unit of occupation”.
The legislation is particularly relevant for those looking to buy, lease, rent or otherwise occupy commercial property. The vast majority of property in England will have had its permissible uses already assigned by its local authority.

Use classes 
The classes of potential uses are divided into groups.  For example, the uses falling under Part A are types of professional service provided to the public and business communities, including the sale of goods or service in shops.  Each part is further divided into sub-groups, which each then contains the specific uses the law is actually concerned with.  Each of the subgroups is assigned a letter (from A to D) and a number, creating for example a 'Class A1 Use', a 'Class B3 Use', etc.

Each Class is used by the Local Planning Authority to allow them to create a suitable balance between residential areas and those for business purposes.  They have the authority to effectively prohibit a 'use' which would be inadvisable due to a particular property's location or other relevant considerations.  The aim is to prevent types of business activities taking place which would have a detrimental effect on the local community.  A hypothetical example might be to veto the location of a proposed heavy metal works or all night club beside a school or housing estate. The following information represents a brief summary of the property classes of use.

Not every use of building is assigned a class under this legislation.  Examples of these include theatres, scrap yards, petrol stations, nightclubs, and casinos, and these are known as sui generis uses.

Class A – shops (including some services) 
This heading is further sub-divided into a variety of everyday commercial uses.

Class A1 – shops and retail outlets 

For those within Class A1, the customers in all cases should be “visiting members of the general public”. Property in this area could include:

Shops (where goods are sold) – but excluding betting offices and payday loan shops which are sui generis
Post offices
Premises where tickets are sold and travel agents
Premises selling cold food (intended for consumption off site)
Hairdressers
Florist
Funeral directors
Premises where goods for sale are displayed (a showroom)
Premises where “domestic or personal” goods or services are hired from
Premises where articles are deposited for washing, cleaning or repair

Class A2 – professional services 

Class A2 moves on to cover “financial and professional services”. Again, these must be offered to the general public. This time, the specification is that “principally” the clients or customers of these types of businesses will again be visiting the premises:

Financial services
Professional services – except those involving health or medical services
Any other services deemed “appropriate” for location within a shopping area

Class A3 – food and drink 

Class A3 consists of one use, namely premises which are to sell “Food and drink”, either to be consumed on site, or on or offsite in the case of hot food. This includes restaurants and cafes.

Class A4 – drinking establishments 

Drinking establishments such as public houses, wine bars or other such establishments.

Class A5 – hot food and takeaway 

For the sale of hot food intended for consumption off the premises.

Class B – further business and industrial activities 
This class covers many common business activities, and is prefaced by the provision for “all or any of” the activities described in Class B1:

Class B1 – business 

B1(a): Offices – except those already mentioned within Class A2.

B1(b): Premises for Research and Development

B1(c): Industrial processes which “can” take place within a residential area without damaging the “amenity of that area”

Since these classes are described in quite general terms, professional advice is advisable before proceeding with negotiations to occupy commercial premises. As the remaining Classes in Part B continue, the uses begin to relate to increasingly specific industrial processes.

Class B2 - general industrial use 

General Industrial Use for the use of carrying on an industrial process other than one falling within class B1 and they may not be correct.

Class B8 – storage or distribution 

Applies to properties which are used “for storage or as a distribution centre”

Class C – hotels, hostels and dwelling houses

Class C1 

Class C1 deals with hotels, boarding houses and guest houses which do not offer care as part of their services.

Class C2 

Residential institutions - Residential care homes, hospitals, nursing homes, boarding schools, residential colleges and training centres.

Class C3 

Class C3 addresses use as a “dwelling house”, as a principal or secondary residence. The classifications were updated in 2010 aligning the definitions of usage C3(a) (“single household”) and C4 ("house in multiple occupation") with those in the Housing Act 2004.

This class is formed of 3 parts:

C3(a): those living together as a single household as defined by the Housing Act 2004, what could be construed as a family.

C3(b): up to six people living together as a single household and receiving care e.g. supported housing schemes such as those for people with learning disabilities or mental health problems.

C3(c): allows for groups of people (up to six) living together as a single household. This allows for those groupings that do not fall within the C4 HMO definition, but which fell within the previous C3 use class, to be provided for i.e. a small religious community may fall into this section as could a homeowner who is living with a lodger.

Class C4 
Houses in multiple occupation – small shared houses occupied by between three and six unrelated individuals, as their only or main residence, who share basic amenities such as a kitchen or bathroom.

Large houses in multiple occupation - with more than 6 people sharing are unclassified by the Use Classes Order.  In planning terms they are described as being sui generis.  In consequence, a planning application will be required for a change of use from a dwellinghouse to a large house in multiple occupation or from a Class C4 house in multiple occupation to a large house in multiple occupation where a material change of use is considered to have taken place.

A number of authorities have issued Article 4 Directions to remove the right to carry out a conversion from C3 to C4 as permitted developments.  This has the effect of requiring planning permission for any change of usage from a "dwelling house" to a "house in multiple occupation".  For example, Nottingham City Council requires planning permission for any conversion of a family dwelling to an HMO in the Nottingham area.

Class D – non-residential institutions

Class D1 

Class D1 covers many ‘public’ services (which do not fall under Class A):  These are mostly F1 or F2 as of 2021

Medical or health services premises which don't form a part of the practitioner's home
Crèches, day nurseries or day centres
Premises for education, is now Class F
Premises which display works of art without commercial transactions (sale or hire)
Museums
Public libraries or reading rooms
Public or exhibition halls
Premises “for, or in connection with, public worship or religious instruction”

Class D2

Class D is revoked from 1 September 2020.

D1 is split out and replaced by the new Classes E(e-f) and F1
D2 is split out and replaced by the new Classes E(d) and F2(c-d) as well as several newly defined ‘Sui Generis’ uses.

Class D2 used to address the use of premises for entertainment and leisure purposes:

 Cinemas
 Concert halls
 Bingo halls (and formerly casinos)
 Dance halls
 Swimming baths, skating rinks, gymnasiums or “area for other indoor or outdoor sports or recreations, not involving motorised vehicles or firearms.”

Sui generis 
Certain uses are specifically defined as Sui Generis by legislation, whereas other uses land in the sui generis category when they fall outside of the defined limits of other use classes.

Prior to the Town and Country Planning (Use Classes) (Amendment) (England) Regulations 2020 changes, the following uses were defined as Sui Generis:

 Theatres
 Amusement arcades / centres or funfairs
 Launderettes
 Fuel stations
 Hiring, selling and/or displaying motor vehicles
 Taxi Business
 Scrap yards, or a yard for the storage/ distribution of minerals and/or the breaking of motor vehicles
 ‘Alkali work’ (any work registrable under the Alkali, etc. Works Regulation Act 1906 (as amended))
 hostels (providing no significant element of care)
 waste disposal installations for the incineration, chemical treatment or landfill of hazardous waste
 retail warehouse clubs
 nightclubs
 casinos
 betting offices/shops
 payday loan shops

As of 1 September 2020, the following uses were added as Sui Generis:

 public houses, wine bars, or drinking establishments – previously Class A4
 drinking establishments with expanded food provision – previously Class A4
 hot food takeaways (for the sale of hot food where consumption of that food is mostly undertaken off the premises) – previously Class A5
 venues for live music performance 
 cinemas – previously Class D2(a)
 concert halls – previously Class D2(b)
 bingo halls – previously Class D2(c)
 dance halls – previously Class D2(d)

References

External links 
Use classes at Planning Geek
Use classes at Planning Portal
Use Classes Order (including Permitted Changes), Knight Frank, 2017

Town and country planning in the United Kingdom